Willy Komen is the name of:

Willy Komen (athlete), Kenyan runner
Willy Komen (politician), Kenyan politician